FC Nika Ivano-Frankivsk, formerly Chornohora, is an amateur Ukrainian football club based in Ivano-Frankivsk. It plays in the Oblast Championship (season 2018–19). It used to compete in the Druha Liha.

 
Amateur football clubs in Ukraine
Football clubs in Ivano-Frankivsk
Association football clubs established in 2001
2001 establishments in Ukraine